Colin Barry Bailey  is a British art historian and museum director. Bailey is currently the Director of the Morgan Library & Museum in New York City. He is a scholar of eighteenth- and nineteenth-century French art, specifically on the artist Pierre-Auguste Renoir.

Early life
Born in London to Max and Hilda Bailey, Bailey received his Bachelor of Arts from Brasenose College (1978), Master of Arts (1982), and Doctor of Philosophy (1985), all in Art History from the University of Oxford. His doctoral dissertation was completed under the supervision of Francis Haskell and concerned patronage and collecting of French paintings during the end of the Ancien Régime. Shortly thereafter, Bailey was awarded a fellowship in the Department of Paintings at the J. Paul Getty Museum in Los Angeles.

Career
Bailey moved to the United States to begin his curatorial career as Assistant Curator for European Painting and Sculpture before 1900 at the Philadelphia Museum of Art, where he worked from 1985 to 1989. In that final year, he was appointed Curator of European Painting and Sculpture at the Kimbell Art Museum, and was promoted to Senior Curator in 1990. Five years later, Bailey was hired as Chief Curator at the National Gallery of Canada, and was appointed Deputy Director and Chief Curator in 1998.

In 2000, Bailey became the Chief Curator of the Frick Collection, and in 2008, he gained his first directorial position after being promoted to Associate Director and Peter Jay Sharp Chief Curator. Bailey also became an inaugural fellow at the Center for Curatorial Leadership. While at the Center, Bailey held at a residency at the Louvre, closely observing its director, Henri Loyrette.

In 2013, Bailey became the director of the Fine Arts Museums of San Francisco, overseeing both the de Young Museum and the Legion of Honor. Two years later, Bailey moved back to New York to become the sixth director of the Morgan Library & Museum, succeeding William Griswold.

Alongside curatorial posts, Bailey has taught art history at a number of institutions, including: the University of Pennsylvania (1988), Bryn Mawr College (1989), Columbia University (2005-2007), and the Graduate Center, CUNY (2009).

Personal life
In 2013, Bailey married Alan Wintermute in New York City.

Awards and honors
Chevalier, Ordre des Arts et des Lettres (1994)
Officier, Ordre des Arts et des Lettres (2010)
Mitchell Prize for the History of Art for Patriotic Taste: Collecting Modern Art in Pre-Revolutionary Paris (2002-2003).
Foundation for Italian Art and Culture Excellency Award (2013)
Fondation Broquette-Gonin Prix du Rayonnement de la Langue et de la Littérature Françaises (2020)

Select works
 
 
 
 
  (co-author with Susan Grace Galassi)

See also
List of Brasenose College, Oxford people
List of members of the Ordre des Arts et des Lettres

References

External links
Frick Collection profile

Living people
1955 births
Alumni of Brasenose College, Oxford
Alumni of the University of Oxford
Gay academics
British art historians
British curators
Directors of museums in the United States
People associated with the J. Paul Getty Museum
People associated with the Philadelphia Museum of Art
Directors of the Frick Collection
University of Pennsylvania faculty
Bryn Mawr College faculty
Columbia University faculty
Graduate Center, CUNY faculty
Chevaliers of the Ordre des Arts et des Lettres
Officiers of the Ordre des Arts et des Lettres